Emlyn Walters (20 May 1918 – 21 January 2001) was a Welsh rugby union, and professional rugby league footballer who played in the 1930s, 1940s and 1950s.

Background
Emlyn Walters was born in Glynneath, Merthyr Tydfil district, Wales, and he died aged 82 in Cwmgwrach, Wales.

Playing career

Pontypridd RFC flyhalf Oliver Morris lodged at a house in Rosser Street, Maesycoed before he 'went North' and signed for Hunslet in November 1937, with team mate Emlyn Walters, who went on to Captain Pontypridd RFC from 1937 to 1939, before he too turned professional with Bradford Northern in July 1939. Walters was an outstanding player in the great Bradford Northern team of this era. His career was interrupted in 1944 when he was called up to the Royal Navy in the second world war where he served as a Chief Petty Officer

International honours
Emlyn Walters won 10 caps for Wales (RL) in 1940–1948 while at Bradford Northern.

County Cup Final appearances
Emlyn Walters played , i.e. number 5, in Bradford Northern's 15-5 victory over Dewsbury in the 1940–41 Yorkshire County Cup Final during the 1940-41 season at Fartown Ground, Huddersfield on Saturday 5 April 1941, played  in the 24-0 victory over Halifax in the 1941–42 Yorkshire Cup Yorkshire County Cup Final during the 1941-42 season at Fartown Ground, Huddersfield on Saturday 6 December 1941, and played  in the 10-7 aggregate victory over Keighley in the 1943–44 Yorkshire County Cup Final during the 1943-44 season, the 5-2 first-leg victory at Odsal Stadium, Bradford on Saturday 27 November 1943, and the 5-5 second-leg draw at Lawkholme Lane, Keighley on Saturday 4 December 1943.

Challenge Cup Final appearances
Emlyn Walters played in Bradford Northern's 8-3 aggregate victory over Wigan in the 1943–44 Challenge Cup Final during the 1943-44 season, absent from the 0-3 first-leg defeat at Central Park, Wigan on Saturday 15 April 1944, he played in the 8-0 second-leg victory at Odsal Stadium, Bradford on Saturday 22 April 1944, and played and scored the opening try in the 8-4 victory over Leeds in the 1946–47 Challenge Cup Final during the 1946-47 season at Wembley Stadium, London on Saturday 3 May 1947 in front of a crowd of 77,605.

Rugby Football League Championship

1939–40 Championship play-off Final played over two legs, played in the first leg, against Swinton away won 21–13 home won 16–9. The 1940–41 Championship play-off Final against Wigan played in both legs away won 17–6 home won 28–9 away, scoring a try in the home and away ties. The 1941-42 Championship play-off Final against Dewsbury losing 0-13, at Headingley, Leeds.

Yorkshire League
Yorkshire County League Winners 1939–40 and Yorkshire League Winners 1940–41

Testimonial match
Bradford Northern's home fixture with Dewsbury on Wednesday 12 May 1949 was Emlyn Walters Testimonial match which he shared with Willie Davies, this match was also their great friend and fellow Welshman Frank Whitcombe's last match for Bradford Northern, a crowd of 19,000 attended Odsal to witness the game

References

4. https://web.archive.org/web/20160804032351/http://www.ponty.net/captain-marvel

External links
Photograph "The 1947 Team" at rlhp.co.uk
Photograph "Team to visit Barrow in the Cup 1946" at rlhp.co.uk
Photograph "Emlyn Walters" at rlhp.co.uk
Photograph "Emlyn Walters" at rlhp.co.uk
Photograph "Northern at Fartown" at rlhp.co.uk
Police appeal for information after "extremely rare" sports medals stolen from Neath Valley house
Stolen Bradford Northern rugby medals appeal by police

1918 births
2001 deaths
Bradford Bulls players
Footballers who switched code
Glynneath RFC players
Pontypridd RFC players
Royal Navy personnel of World War II
Rugby league players from Neath Port Talbot
Rugby league wingers
Rugby union players from Glynneath
Rugby union wings
Wales national rugby league team players
Welsh rugby league players
Welsh rugby union players